81 Geminorum is a binary star system in the northern constellation of Gemini. It has the Bayer designation g Geminorum, while 81 Geminorum is its Flamsteed designation. This system is visible to the naked eye as a faint, orange-hued point of light with an apparent visual magnitude of 4.89. The pair are located approximately 360 light years away from the Sun, based on parallax, and are moving further away with a radial velocity of +83 km/s, having come to within an estimated  of the Earth nearly a million years ago. 81 Geminorum lies close enough to the ecliptic to undergo lunar occultations.

The variable velocity of this system was first suspected at the Dominion Astrophysical Observatory in 1921, then confirmed by the Lick Observatory in 1922. The visible component is an aging giant star with a stellar classification of K4 III, having exhausted the supply of hydrogen at its core then expanded to 34 times the Sun's radius. It is over six billion years old with 1.22 times the mass of the Sun. This is a candidate alpha-enhanced star that displays a significant overabundance of silicon. The star is radiating around 287 times the Sun's luminosity from its bloated photosphere at an effective temperature of 4,095 K.

References

K-type giants
Spectroscopic binaries

Gemini (constellation)
Geminorum, g
Durchmusterung objects
Geminorum, 81
062721
037908
3003